Skaw may refer to:

Skaw, Unst, a village in the north east of the Shetland Islands
Skaw, Whalsay, a village in the east of the Shetland Islands

See also
 The Scaw
 SCAW (disambiguation)